The Slovenia men's national under-16 and under-17 basketball team represents Slovenia in international under-16 and under-17 (under age 16 and under age 17) competitions. It is organized and run by the Basketball Federation of Slovenia (Košarkarska zveza Slovenije).

Competitive record

World Cup

European Championship

See also
 Slovenia national basketball team
 Slovenia men's national under-20 basketball team
 Slovenia men's national under-19 basketball team

References

External links
 

under
Men's national under-16 basketball teams
Men's national under-17 basketball teams